Wai-Wai may refer to:

Wai-wai people, an ethnic group in Brazil and Guyana
Waiwai language, the language of this group
Wai Wai (food brand), a noodle dish
 WaiWai, a discontinued column published in the Mainichi Daily News